Dongwu (February – November 1648) was the era name of Zhu Changqing, Prince of Huai of the Southern Ming, and was used for a total of 1 year.

Comparison table

Other regime era names that existed during the same period
 China
 Shunzhi (順治, 1644–1661): Qing dynasty — era name of the Shunzhi Emperor
 Yongli (永曆, 1647–1683): Southern Ming — era name of the Yongli Emperor
 Jianguo Lu (監國魯, 1646–1653): Southern Ming — era name of Zhu Yihai, Prince of Lu
 Dingwu (定武, 1646–1664): Southern Ming — era name of Zhu Benli (Zhu Danji), Prince of Han (doubtful)
 Tianzheng (天正, 1648): Qing period — era name of Zhang Jintang (張近堂)
 Vietnam
 Phúc Thái (福泰, 1643–1649): Later Lê dynasty — era name of Lê Chân Tông
 Thuận Đức (順德, 1638–1677): Mạc dynasty — era name of Mạc Kính Vũ
 Japan
 Shōhō (正保, 1644–1648): era name of Emperor Go-Kōmyō
 Keian (慶安, 1648–1652): era name of Emperor Go-Kōmyō

See also
 List of Chinese era names
 List of Ming dynasty era names

Notes

References

Southern Ming eras